Shame is a novel by the Swedish crime-writer Karin Alvtegen, originally published as Skam in Sweden in 2005. It was translated into English by Steven T. Murray in 2006 and was shortlisted for the Duncan Lawrie International Dagger award for crime novels in translation .

External links
 Publisher's page for the novel

2005 Swedish novels
Swedish crime novels
Canongate Books books
Swedish-language novels